Hugo Dellien was the defending champion but lost in the quarterfinals to Juan Manuel Cerúndolo.

Nicolás Jarry won the title after defeating Cerúndolo 6–2, 7–5 in the final.

Seeds

Draw

Finals

Top half

Bottom half

References

External links
Main draw
Qualifying draw

Lima Challenger II - 1
2021 Singles